Nicholas "Nick" Smith is a Democratic member of the Illinois House of Representatives representing the 34th district. The 34th district includes the Chatham and Roseland neighborhoods in Chicago along with the all or parts of Burnham, Calumet City, Lansing, Ford Heights, Lynwood, Sauk Village, Willowbrook, Beecher, Manteno and Grant Park.

Early life and career
Smith earned a bachelor of science in chemistry from Chicago State University in 2000. Prior to his appointment to the Illinois House of Representatives, he served as the Ward Superintendent for Chicago's 9th ward; overseeing all services provided by streets and sanitation in the ward. In 2014, Smith ran for Cook County Board 4th District seat and would finish second in the Democratic primary. He has also worked as a legislative aide to the Chicago City Council Transportation Committee and a community liaison for Chicago State University.

Illinois House of Representatives
Smith was appointed to fill the vacancy left in the legislature when Elgie Sims was elevated to serve in the State Senate. He also serves as a member of the Roseland Community Medical District Commission, which seeks to spur economic development around Roseland Community Hospital.

As of July 3, 2022, Representative Smith was a member of the following Illinois House committees:

 Appropriations - Higher Education Committee (HAPI)
 Clean Energy Subcommittee (HENG-CLEA)
 (Chairman of) Economic Opportunity & Equity Committee (HECO)
 Energy & Environment Committee (HENG)
 Insurance Committee (HINS)
 Internation Trade & Commerce Committee (HITC)
 Prescription Drug Affordability Committee (HPDA)

Electoral history

References

External links
 Profile at Illinois General Assembly

Living people
Year of birth missing (living people)
21st-century American politicians
African-American state legislators in Illinois
Chicago State University alumni
Democratic Party members of the Illinois House of Representatives
Politicians from Chicago
21st-century African-American politicians